Vanda Hybnerová (born 30 September 1968) is a Czech stage and film actress. After studying at the Faculty of Theatre in Prague, she appeared in various theatres in Prague. She was named the Best Actress in a Play at the 2004 Thalia Awards. Following her award, she has appeared in numerous television series and films.

Career
Hybnerová joined the Faculty of Theatre in Prague in 1988, where she studied acting. During her studies, she performed at theatres including Semafor, Divadlo pod Palmovkou and the National Theatre.

A year later, her performance in Hořké slzy Petry von Kantové earned her a nomination for Best Actress at the Alfréd Radok Awards.

Having appeared in a number of television roles on TV Nova, Hybnerová joined the cast of Ulice in 2012. She directed and acted in the play Terapie at Divadlo Palace, which premiered in Prague in October 2016.

Personal life
Hybnerová was born in Prague to painter Jana Kremanová and Boris Hybner, who was also an actor. When she was six, her father left home and she was raised by her mother. She and her father appeared together in the Czech television series Přístav. In 1993, Hybnerová married Czech actor Saša Rašilov, with whom she has two daughters: Josefína and Antonia. They lived on a farm in the Bohemian-Moravian Highlands, subsequently living separately for a year before deciding to divorce in 2014.

Filmography

Films

Television

References

External links

1968 births
Living people
Actresses from Prague
Czech film actresses
Czech television actresses
Czech stage actresses
20th-century Czech actresses
21st-century Czech actresses
Academy of Performing Arts in Prague alumni
Recipients of the Thalia Award